Dani is a surname.

Notable people
Notable people with the surname include:
Ahmad Hasan Dani (1920–2009), Pakistani archaeologist, historian, and linguist
Prabhakar Balwant Dani (1908–1965), RSS Pracharak
 Amit Dani (born 1973), Indian cricketer for Mumbai
 Ashu Dani (born 1974), Indian cricketer for Delhi
 Ashwin Dani, Indian entrepreneur
 Bal Dani (1933–1999), Indian cricketer
 Harsheel Dani (born 1996), Indian badminton player
 Rajesh Dani (born 1961), Indian cricketer
 S. G. Dani (born 1947), Indian mathematician
 Shashikala Dani (born 1959), Indian musician

References

Indian surnames